Ağalıkənd (also, Aghalykend, Saryabad, and Seri-abad) is a village in the Bilasuvar District of Azerbaijan.

References 

Populated places in Bilasuvar District